Girlosophy is a series of bestselling and award-winning self-help/spirituality books written by Anthea Paul.  Started in 2000 with Girlosophy: A Soul Survival Kit, there are currently eight published Girlosophy books. The books are directed to young women. They emphasize being true to oneself and individual using big sister advice and fun and modern visuals from around the world with no photo manipulation.

Series
The series cover a variety of issues relating to all young women.

Girlosophy: A Soul Survival Kit
Published in October 2002 by Allen and Unwin

The first book of the Girlosophy series.  It introduces Girlosophy as a new way of thinking about life which captures the spirit of being a woman in the twenty-first century.

Awards

Highly Commended in The Colour Symphony Best Designed Illustrated Book category of the 2000 APA Design Awards.

Girlosophy 2: The Love Survival Kit
Published in November 2001 by Allen and Unwin

Awards

Shortlisted: The Colour Symphony Best Designed Illustrated Book APA Design Awards 2002.

This text examines the role of love and romantic relationships in life.

Girlosophy: The Oracle
Published in October 2002 by Allen and Unwin

Girlosophy: The Breakup Survival Kit
Published in November 2004 by Allen and Unwin

Girlosophy: Real Girls' Stories
Published in November 2005 by Allen and Unwin

Girlosophy: Real Girls Eat
Published in November 2005 by Allen and Unwin. Girlosophy: Real Girls Eat is an inspirational cookbook. The book makes it a point to stress that it is not a traditional diet book because it does not focus on eating to lose weight. Instead it focuses on eating healthy. The book is separated into three parts.  The first part is an informational section providing facts and guidance on how to choose foods that are not only good for the body but also the environment. The next two sections provide the recipe cookbook. The first section of recipes are contributions from real young women from various areas of the globe. The second recipe section and third and final part of the book is a compilation of recipes provided by Paul's sister, Kate Paul, a professional celebrity chef.

Awards

In 2006 Girlosophy: Real Girls Eat was the winner of the 2006 the Furi Knives Award for Excellence and in the Soft-cover Food-related Book categories in the Vittoria Australian Food Media Awards

My Girlosophy
Published in November 2006 by Allen and Unwin

The Girlo Travel Survival Kit
Published in January 2008 by Allen and Unwin

Author
Anthea Paul is from Sydney Australia. She has worked as a photographer and writer for woman's surfing magazines, and has also made contributions to various other international magazines. Other international work Paul has been involved in includes being an art director in the publishing, fashion, and design industries doing photo styling and editing, and trend forecasting. Some of the negative characteristics of this work, such as frequent contact with eating disorders, and airbrushing of unrealistic ideal photographs of women inspired Paul in her Girlosophy technique of portraying real, natural unaltered women.

References

Self-help books
Series of non-fiction books